Anguilcourt-le-Sart is a commune in the department of Aisne in the Hauts-de-France region of northern France.

Notable incidents

On 19 May 1983, 41 barrels of highly toxic chemical waste (dioxin-based), originating from the Seveso disaster, were found in an unused abattoir in Anguilcourt-le-Sart. The barrels, which had been illegally abandoned here by a transport contractor, were transferred the same evening to a military base near Sissonne. They were later destroyed in a high-temperature incinerator in Switzerald.

Geography
Anguilcourt-le-Sart is located some 30 km southeast of Saint-Quentin and 25 km northwest of Laon.  The A26 autoroute (Autoroute des Anglais, E17) from Saint-Quentin to Rheims passes through the northeastern part of the commune but has no exit in the commune.  Access to the commune is by the D69 road from Renansart in the northeast passing through the heart of the commune and village and continuing south to Les Larris. The D643 road also enters the commune from Achery in the west through the village and continuing east to Nouvion-le-Comte. the commune is almost entirely farmland except for some forest in the southwest.

The Serre river flows through the commune from east to west just south of the village forming a part of the western boundary of the commune before joining the Oise at Le Travers.

Neighbouring communes and villages

Anguilcourt and Le Sart merged between 1790 and 1800.

Administration

List of Successive Mayors of Anguilcourt-le-Sart

Population

Sights

The Garden at Fort Mayot is registered as an historical monument.

See also
 Communes of the Aisne department
 Seveso disaster

References

External links
 Anguilcourt-le-Sart on the old IGN website 
 Anguilcourt-le-Sart on Géoportail, National Geographic Institute (IGN) website 
 Anguilcourt and le Sart on the 1750 Cassini Map

Communes of Aisne